Tönnes Björkman (25 March 1888 – 21 November 1959) was a Swedish sport shooter who competed in the 1912 Summer Olympics.

In 1912 he won the bronze medal as member of the Swedish team in the team military rifle competition. In the 1912 Summer Olympics he also participated in the following events:

 300 metre free rifle, three positions - eighth place
 300 metre military rifle, three positions - 14th place
 600 metre free rifle - 25th place

References

External links
profile

1888 births
1959 deaths
Swedish male sport shooters
ISSF rifle shooters
Olympic shooters of Sweden
Shooters at the 1912 Summer Olympics
Olympic bronze medalists for Sweden
Olympic medalists in shooting
Medalists at the 1912 Summer Olympics
19th-century Swedish people
20th-century Swedish people